Dagfinn Sverre Aarskog (born 10 February 1973) is a Norwegian bobsledder. He competed in the four-man competition at the 1998 Winter Olympics.

References

1973 births
Living people
Bobsledders at the 1998 Winter Olympics
Norwegian male bobsledders
Olympic bobsledders of Norway
People from Lørenskog
Sportspeople from Viken (county)